Fur Fighters (titled Furrballs in early development) is a video game developed by Bizarre Creations and published by Acclaim Entertainment for the Dreamcast in 2000, later for Microsoft Windows. The game was first announced as a Dreamcast exclusive in the January 1999 issue of EGM Magazine, having started development in the summer of 1998. It was designed very much as a standard third-person shooter, but used a world populated by cute little animals as its setting. As a result, the game's depiction of violence is very cartoon-like without losing any of its intensity. In 2001, an updated version for the PlayStation 2 was released as Fur Fighters: Viggo's Revenge. On 20 July 2012, members of Muffin Games, ex-Bizarre Creations staff, announced a conversion for iPad, called Fur Fighters: Viggo on Glass.

Plot
The plot of the game revolves around the Fur Fighters, a group dedicated to fighting against General Viggo, the game's main antagonist. At the beginning of the game, Viggo kidnaps the families of the Fur Fighters, stranding their children around the game's various locations and turning the spouses (Or in Tweek's case, mother) into robotic beasts. The story is rather loose, revolving around the Fur Fighters' quest to rescue their babies, save their family and stop General Viggo.

Gameplay
In Fur Fighters, the player's job is to rescue the tiny animal babies who have been taken from their families by the central villain, General Viggo. Viggo has scattered these babies all over the world, requiring the Fur Fighter families  to explore, confront Viggo's henchmen, and rescue all of them. The gameplay featured many unique aspects for a third-person shooter of the time it was released, most notably making each level an extremely large, expansive area that requires sometimes hours of involved exploration to locate the babies and get rid of the enemies. (Examples include a giant construction site and an entire section of a large city, complete with buildings to explore, including a complete museum of modern art.) Maneuvering through these levels often requires careful observation of the environment so as not to get lost, as well as solving puzzles to figure out where some babies might be hidden or how to gain access to more of the level. Unlike most action games of this type, Fur Fighters distinguishes itself by featuring a system where the player can, at many intervals on a level, switch between one of many animal parents. Each parent has their own advantages and disadvantages, with many having special abilities allowing them to do certain things easier. This substitute system also makes it easier for players who are low on hit points or ammunition to switch to a more suitable character.

Reception

Garrett Kenyon reviewed the Dreamcast version of the game for Next Generation, rating it three stars out of five, and stated that "A game that's fun for kids and adults alike. It looks great and plays even better."

Daniel Erickson reviewed the PlayStation 2 version of the game for Next Generation, rating it two stars out of five, and stated that "If you want a shooter or an adventure game, there are better places to turn."

The Dreamcast version of Fur Fighters received "favourable" reviews, while its PC version, along with Viggo's Revenge and Viggo on Glass, received "mixed or average reviews", according to video game review aggregator Metacritic.

While the game was not a tremendous financial success and went almost unnoticed by the majority of gamers at the time, critically the game was almost universally praised for its size, scope, sense of humour, and attention to detail. The fact that mindless violence was not the sole gameplay element impressed many, and the game went on to become a cult classic of sorts. In an attempt to take the series further with a larger audience, a new version of the game entitled Fur Fighters: Viggo's Revenge was released in 2001 on the PlayStation 2. It met with mixed success as it was simply an update of the original game with a few minor features included (such as Cel-shading and voice acting).

References

External links

2000 video games
Acclaim Entertainment games
Dreamcast games
IOS games
PlayStation 2 games
Third-person shooters
Video games about animals
Video games developed in the United Kingdom
Video games with cel-shaded animation
Windows games
Multiplayer and single-player video games
Bizarre Creations games
3D platform games